The Pigsty is a folly located next to Fyling Hall School, near Robin Hood's Bay, North Yorkshire, England. It is a Grade II* listed wooden building that was once a functioning home for pigs. It is now operated by the Landmark Trust as a holiday home.

The date of the building is uncertain – it seemed to have been completed in 1891, but alterations may have been made as late as 1906. The folly was designed by the local Squire and Justice of the Peace, John Warren Barry (1851–1920), who was attracted to Mediterranean buildings.  His book "Studies in Corsica: Sylvan and Social", published in 1893, has recently been reissued in paperback.

A 15 years old apprentice, Matthew Hart (30.1.1874-16.4.1970)  was employed in the building of the sties. He reported that Squire Barry had no fixed idea as to their final appearance and frequently changed his mind during their construction. Mr Hart was so delighted when the squire finally approved the sties that he climbed on the roof and danced a jig, falling off and breaking his nose.

The pigsty was only one of Squire Barry's creations. One was a cow byre in the shape of a church complete with oaken doors and stalls and stained glass windows. An employee recited rote verses from the bible as the cows were milked.

The squire also had a chicken coop built in the shape of a pyramid. Unfortunately, he was unaware that pyramids had a solid inside and the capping stones soon collapsed, injuring a farm worker.

By the mid 1980s the building was deteriorating badly and the owner, Mrs White, was concerned as to its future. The inside was full of detritus and the columns were all starting to collapse.  Pinned to a beam inside were sheets of paper documenting its history.

Details about the sties were passed on to a researcher requesting information about unusual moorland buildings. The sties appeared shortly afterwards in a TV program fronted by Lucinda Lambton

After renovation by the Landmark Trust the sties were reopened on 17 December 1991.

References

 Information on The Pigsty at the Landmark Trust's website

External links

 http://www.coast-alive.eu/content/life-pigsty

Buildings and structures in North Yorkshire
Folly buildings in England
Landmark Trust properties in England
Neoclassical architecture in Yorkshire
Grade II* listed buildings in North Yorkshire
Grade II* listed agricultural buildings
Pigs